Algeria has an embassy in Ankara, and a general consulate in Istanbul. Turkey has an embassy in Algiers. Both countries are full members of the Union for the Mediterranean.

History
Up from 16th century until 1830, northern Algeria was part of the Ottoman Empire, then known as Ottoman Algeria. Algers was one of the eyalets and enjoyed a significant degree of political autonomy. 

In 2017, one of the symbols for the 500-year old friendship between Turkey and Algeria, the Ketchaoua Mosque in Algiers, was restored with Turkish funds. Restoration was one of the projects related to "Friendship and Cooperation Agreement" signed during  Prime Minister of Turkey Recep Tayyip Erdoğan's visit to Algeria in 2006.

History has been in the core of both sides officials' discourse regarding the Algeria–Turkey relations. The Turkish Ministry of Foreign Affairs describes it as: "Turkey and Algeria share common history as well as deep-rooted cultural and brotherly ties." In order to consolidate relations between the two countries, a cultural and historical symposium was organized in 2017. During the meeting, Algerian Minister of Culture Azzedine Mihoubi said "We need to increase the number of such activities on our common history and look more into our history belonging to the Ottoman period".

Modern relations
Turkey first voted unfavorable (1955) and then abstained (1958) in the voting on Algeria's independence at the UN. The main reason to that, was Turkey's aim to get closer with France and favoring Algerian Independence would negatively affect France–Turkey relations. However, this decision of Turkish officials was later critiqued as propensity for shorttermism  and damaged biliteral relations. First step to restore the situation was taken by then Prime Minister of Turkey Turgut Özal. He visited Algeria in 1985 and explicitly apologized for Turkey's unfavorable voting. Following year, Algerian Prime Minister Abdelhamid Brahimi paid a visit (first official Algerian visit to Turkey) and signed an oil trade deal with Turkey. In 1999, Turkish President Süleyman Demirel stated that negative connotations of Turkey's abstaining vote in 1958 are totally erased. Algerian President Abdelaziz Bouteflika paid a visit to Turkey in 2005. Mutual visits have been a turning point to strengthen bilateral relations as well as reviving friendship between the countries."

Algeria is a partner for Turkey with increasing importance in Africa and considered to be an important partner in the Islamic world and Africa for Turkey. Meanwhile Algeria is a close partner of Iran. In fact, Algeria was one of the countries that abstained from voting on a 2012 UN draft resolution condemning human rights violations by the Assad regime which is supported by Iran. Iranian officials have also previously underlined that Iran and Algeria have the capacity to create a new world order. Aware of this situation, Turkey seems determined not to leave its potential African partners in the hands of rival regional and global powers. Therefore, In 2013, Prime Minister of Turkey Recep Tayyip Erdoğan paid a visit to Algeria and met Algerian President Abdelaziz Bouteflika in Algiers. Increasing cooperations, both economic, political and security, were placed.

Economy
"We see Algeria as an island of political and economic stability in the region. Our first trading partner in Africa is Algeria." said Turkish President Erdoğan and he added:"Therefore, around one thousand Turkish firms are in Algeria carrying on businesses with an investment volume of 3.5 billion dollars."
Algeria is Turkey's 23rd largest export market and 25th largest supplier of goods imports with a total trade volume of 4.5 billion while  Turkey is Algeria's 6th biggest economic partner. Algeria's most exported good to Turkey is oil hydrocarbons and natural gas. Algeria imports construction material the most from Turkey. Algeria is the 4th biggest natural gas supplier of Turkey with %8 percent of the share.

Security
In 2003, Turkish-Algerian ministers signed a security memo against drug, human trafficking and organized crimes. Both sides described terrorism as a big problem and discussed uniting struggles against such groups and organizations. By the October of the same year, a military cooperation agreement was framed. The agreement included clauses such as technology transfer, common military drills and exchange of military information. Turkey, as a NATO member, plays a significant role on the thawing relations between the group and Algeria, due to the importance of Algeria for the regional security of Africa and MENA. Turkey is also becoming an increasingly important weapon exporter to Algeria and military cooperation between the two countries is growing as well, given the status of Algerian People's National Armed Forces as one of the most well-trained, battle-hardened and professional Arab militaries.

State visits 
From Algeria to Turkey:

From Turkey to Algeria:

See also 
 Turks in Algeria
 Foreign relations of Algeria
 Foreign relations of Turkey

References

External links
 People's Democratic Republic of Algeria's Embassy in Ankara 
 Embassy of Turkey in Algeria 

 
Turkey
Bilateral relations of Turkey